Mihalić or Mihalich may refer to:

People
 Franjo Mihalić (1920–2015), Yugoslav and Croatian long-distance runner
 Herman Mihalich (1930–1997), American politician
 Irene Mihalic (born 1976), German politician
 Joe Mihalich (born 1956), American college basketball coach
 John Mihalic (1911–1987), American baseball player
 Marcello Mihalich, also spelled Mihalić (1907–1996), Italian football player and coach

Other uses
 Mihalich, Haskovo Province, a village in Bulgaria

See also
 Mihaliç (disambiguation)